The Party of Free Democrats is a political party in Ukraine led by Mykhaylo Brodskyy. It was registered in November 1999 as Yabluko (Apple). The party has about 1,000 members.

History

Mykhaylo Brodskyy (a member of the Hromada faction) formed a 14-member "Yabluko" faction in the Ukrainian Parliament mid-September 2000.

At the parliamentary elections on 30 March 2002, the party won 1.2% of the popular vote and no seats (as Yabluko).

In March 2005, the party was self-liquidated and merged into Fatherland Party (Batkivschuna) led by Yulia Tymoshenko. But in March 2007 Mykhaylo Brodskyy announced the renewal of the party; renaming it Party of Free Democrats.

On 30 September 2007, elections, the party failed again to win parliamentary representation.

The party nominated Brodskyy as its candidate for President of Ukraine in the 2010 Ukrainian presidential elections late October 2009.

During the 2010 Ukrainian local elections, the party won representatives in municipalities and did particularly well in Cherkasy.

In the 2010 local elections, the party won 1 representative in the regional parliaments of the Cherkasy Oblast and 14 seats in the city council of Cherkasy.

In the 2012 Ukrainian parliamentary election the party competed in/for 1 constituency (seat); but it lost in it and thus missed parliamentary representation.

The party did not participate in the 2014 Ukrainian parliamentary election.

In the 2019 Ukrainian parliamentary election the party had 2 candidates in constituencies, but both lost.

Election results

See also
 Bloc Yulia Tymoshenko
 Yabloko

References

External links
 Official website

Liberal parties in Ukraine